This is a list of television broadcasters from around the world which provide coverage of both World Rugby men's and women's Sevens Series competitions.

International 
All matches in all circuits are streamed through all social medias platform and official website of World Rugby in the unsold markets with highlights available in all territories.

Americas

Europe

Japan 
All matches in all circuits is aired live on Wowow

Oceania

Sub-saharan Africa 
All matches in all circuits is aired live on SuperSport.

References 

Broadcasters
World Rugby Sevens Series